Chased by the Devil is a 1950 West German crime film directed by Viktor Tourjansky and starring Hans Albers, Willy Birgel and Lil Dagover. A doctor discovers a new medical cure with dangerous side effects, and takes the drug himself to test its limitations.

It was shot at the Bavaria Studios in Munich and on location around the city. The film's sets were designed by the art directors Franz Bi and Botho Hoefer.

Cast

References

Bibliography

External links 
 

1950 films
West German films
German crime drama films
1950 crime drama films
1950s German-language films
Films directed by Victor Tourjansky
Medical-themed films
Mad scientist films
Bavaria Film films
Films shot at Bavaria Studios
German black-and-white films
1950s German films